Biscuit Step is a step-like rise in the level of Tucker Glacier above its junction with Trafalgar Glacier, in Victoria Land. It is very crevassed in its north half, but there is a good route of easy gradient through it toward its southern end. Biscuits were an important part of the expedition's rations (Australasian colloquialism "tucker"), and a small cache of them was left near the step for the return down the glacier by the New Zealand Geological Survey Antarctic Expedition, 1957–58, which named the feature.

References
 

Ice rises of Antarctica
Landforms of Victoria Land
Borchgrevink Coast